Smile, You is a 2009 South Korean television series starring Lee Min-jung and Jung Kyung-ho, in their first leading roles in a Korean drama. Directed by Lee Tae-gon and written by Moon Hee-jung, it aired on SBS from September 26, 2009 to March 7, 2010 on Saturdays and Sundays at 21:45 for 45 episodes. In the drama, a wealthy household's fall from grace forces them to bunk with their ex-chauffeur's family.

Synopsis
Seo Jung-in is the third child of a rich family. She gets dumped by her groom Lee Han-se on their wedding day after his family finds out that the Seo family has gone bankrupt, with Han-se literally leaving her stranded on the highway. She stops a taxi, causing trouble for a bus where Kang Hyun-soo, who had just gotten back to Korea after studying in the United States, sits. He is in love with Jung-in's older sister, Jung-kyung, who was Hyun-soo's classmate in college. Jung-in ends up being taken in by the family of Kang Man-bok, their former chauffeur. She discovers that Hyun-soo, with whom she's had many bickering encounters, is Man-bok's grandson. Planning to run to their eldest son, Seo Sung-joon (a professional golf player overseas), the Seo family is about to leave the country when the police arrest their father and puts him in jail. The Seo's then discover that their house was sold from under them. With nowhere else to go, they, too, are forced to live with the Kang family.

As time passes, both families get closer to each other. Jung-in in particular adjusts to normal life and falls in love with Hyun-soo, despite knowing his feelings for her older sister. Jung-in now has a job in Han-se's automobile company, where Hyun-soo also works. Eventually, Hyun-soo realizes that his feelings for Jung-kyung have faded and he is more comfortable with Jung-in. Hyun-soo and Jung-in begin dating, but they keep it secret because Hyun-soo's mother doesn't like Jung-in.

Meanwhile, Han-se regrets giving up Jung-in. He sacrifices Global Motors to prove that Jung-in is more important to him than anyone else. Also, Hyun-soo and Jung-in's relationship is put to the test when Jung-kyung suddenly realizes that she likes Hyun-soo, leading to confusion and soul-searching from Hyun-soo.

Despite the obstacles they go through (their parents' disapproval, Hyun-soo's grandfather Man-bok diagnosed with liver cancer), the couple remain in love and at peace with each other. At the end, Hyun-soo and Jung-in are married, with twins. Jung-in's brother Sung-joon also marries his sweetheart Ji-soo.

Cast
Seo family
Lee Min-jung as Seo Jung-in 
Lee Chun-hee as Seo Sung-joon 
Choi Jung-yoon as Seo Jung-kyung 
Kang Seok-woo as Seo Jung-gil 
Heo Yoon-jung as Gong Joo-hee

Kang family
Jung Kyung-ho as Kang Hyun-soo 
Choi Bool-am as Kang Man-bok 
Chun Ho-jin as Kang Sang-hoon
Song Ok-sook as Baek Geum-ja

Extended cast
Lee Kyu-han as Lee Han-se
Jeon Hye-jin as Jung Ji-soo
Yoon Joo-sang as Lee Joon-bae
Choi Kwon as Park Kyung-soo 
Park Joon-geum as Han-se's mother
Jung So-nyeo as So-nyeo
Hong Il-kwon as Han Min-joon
Han Bo-bae as Han Yoon-jae
Choi Song-hyun as Hong Sun-woo
Jung Min-sung as Secretary Kim
Ji Yoo as BEAT member
Jo Yoon-hee as Hyun-soo's blind date (cameo)

Awards 
2009 SBS Drama Awards 
Best Supporting Actor in a Special Planning Drama: Kang Seok-woo
PD Award: Jung Kyung-ho
New Star Award: Lee Min-jung

Remake 
Smile, You was the first Korean drama to be remade in India, and Zindagi Kahe – Smile Please ("Life Says - Smile Please") aired on Life OK in 2011-2012. A Turkish remake titled Gülümse Yeter began airing in July.

References

External links 
  
 

Seoul Broadcasting System television dramas
2009 South Korean television series debuts
2010 South Korean television series endings
Korean-language television shows
South Korean romantic comedy television series
Television series by Logos Film